Annamayya district  is one of the twenty-six districts in the Indian state of Andhra Pradesh and one of the eight districts in the Rayalaseema region formed from Rajampeta Parliamentary Constituency. Rayachoti is the district administrative headquarters and Madanapalle is the largest city in the district. The newly formed district has a 64.53% literacy rate, which is lower than the state literacy which stands at 67.35%.

Geography
Annamayya district is the extreme southeastern district of Andhra Pradesh situated within the geographical co-ordinate of 13° 19’ 55” and 14° 42’ 32” of northern latitude and 78° 18’ 55” and 79° 20’26” Eastern longitude. The District is bounded on North by Kadapa District , West by Sri Sathya Sai District  and South By Chikballapur District And Kolar District of Karnataka and Chittoor of Andhra Pradesh, East by Nellore and Tirupati districts Of Andhra Pradesh.

Volcanogenic bedded Barytes 
Volcanogenic bedded Barytes located at Mangampet in Obulavaripalle mandal has been declared the National Geological Monuments of India by the Geological Survey of India (GSI), for their protection, maintenance, promotion and enhancement of geotourism.

Etymology
The district is named after the Annamacharya, a 15th-century Hindu saint hailing from Tallapaka, Rajampeta and the earliest known Indian musician to compose songs called sankirtanas in praise of the Lord Venkateswara.

History
This district is formed on 4 April 2022 by the Government of Andhra Pradesh.The district was formed from Madanapalle revenue division of Chittoor district and Rajampeta revenue division and a newly formed Rayachoti revenue division from Kadapa district. Madanapalle revenue division is the largest revenue division in the district.

Demographics 

At the time of the 2011 census Annamayya district had a population of 16,97,308, of which 391,511 (23.07%) live in urban areas. Annamayya district has a sex ratio of 989 females per 1000 males. Scheduled Castes and Scheduled Tribes make up 2,28,501 (13.46%) and 62,475 (3.68%) of the population respectively.

At the time of the 2011 census 81.91% of the population spoke Telugu, 16.40% Urdu and 1.04% Lambadi as their first language.

Administrative divisions 

The district has three revenue divisions, namely Rajampeta, Rayachoti, and Madanapalle, each headed by a sub collector. Madanapalle is the largest revenue division in the district. These revenue divisions are divided into 30 mandals. The district consists of one municipal corporation in Madanapalle and two municipalities in Rayachoti and Rajampet.

Mandals 

There are nine mandals in Rajampeta revenue division, 10 mandals in Rayachoti revenue division and 11 mandals in Madanapalle revenue division. The 30 mandals under their revenue divisions are listed below.

Politics 
There is only one parliamentary constituency and six assembly constituencies in Annamayya district.

The parliamentary constituencies are:

 Rajampet (Lok Sabha constituency)

The assembly constituencies are:

Education 
The primary and secondary school education is imparted by government aided and private schools of the School Education Department of the state Government of Andhra Pradesh. The medium of instruction followed by different schools are English and Telugu.
District has some of the most famous institutions for engineering, such as Annamacharya Institute of Technology & Sciences (AITS) and Narayanadri Institute of Science and Technology (NIST). Madanapalle Institute of Technology & Science (MITS) situated in Madanapalle. Besant Theosophical College, Madanapalle. Rishi Valley School, Madanapalle

Transport

Roadways
District  is the entranceway to the pilgrimage site of Tirumala.

• National Highway NH 716 : Chennai-Kurnool Chennai - Surat Green filed Corridor, passes through the district.

• NH 40 Chittoor-Kurnool passes through the district.

• NH 71 passes through this district.

• Proposed NH 370 Nellore to Ananthapuram (Nellore–Rapur–Rajampet–Rayachoti–Kadiri–Ananthapuram) is currently under planning passes through the district.

• district well connected to all major national highways NH 40, NH 71.

The Andhra Pradesh State Road Transport Corporation operates bus services from Sri Annamayya Bus Station, Madanapalle Bus Station, Rayachoty Bus Station, Pileru Bus Station to Major cities Chittoor, Kadapa, Tirupati, Nellore, Kurnool, Hyderabad, Chennai, Bengaluru, Anantapur, and to other towns and villages in the district.
NH 42 passes through the district starts at Mulakalacheruvu Mandal and ends at Madanapalle Mandal

Railways

District has two railway stations, which are major stations in the district that comes under the South Central Railway Zone of Guntakal railway division.

• Madanapalle & Rajampeta Railway Stations in the district are well connected to major cities like Mumbai, Hyderabad, Chennai, Tirupati, Ahmedabad, Kurnool, Hubli, Goa, Pune, Surat, Delhi, Shirdi, Kadapa from Annamayya District through Guntakal-Renigunta Stretch.

• Madanapalle Road Railway Station in the district is connected to few cities from the Annamayya District through Guntakal-Pakal-Tirupati stretch.

• Very well railway conneivityed to Chennai, Mumbai, Delhi, Hyderabad, Guntakal, Hubli, Goa, Arakonam, Renigunta Junction, Kurnool, Kolhapur, Tirupati.

Airways
The nearest airports are:

• Tirupati International Airport is  Kms From Pileru and  Kms from Madanapalle.

• Local transport is available from the bus and railway stations to the airports.

Cities and towns

Notable people 

Jiddu Krishnamurti greatest philosopher
 Kiran Abbavaram, actor
 Annamacharya, poet
 Kiran Kumar Reddy, Former Chief Minister And Assembly Speaker Of  Andhra Pradesh

References 

Districts of Andhra Pradesh
2022 establishments in Andhra Pradesh
Annamayya district